Inape auxoplaca is a species of moth of the family Tortricidae and is endemic to Colombia.

References

Moths described in 1926
Endemic fauna of Colombia
auxoplaca
Moths of South America